Erik Schoefs (born 4 January 1967) is a Belgian former cyclist. He competed at the 1988 Summer Olympics and the 1992 Summer Olympics. He also acted as a pacesetter during his sporting career.

References

External links
 

1967 births
Living people
Belgian male cyclists
Olympic cyclists of Belgium
Cyclists at the 1988 Summer Olympics
Cyclists at the 1992 Summer Olympics
People from Tongeren
Cyclists from Limburg (Belgium)
Pacemakers